Cedar Township is a township in Sac County, Iowa, USA. Part of Lytton, Iowa is within Cedar Township.

Geography 

The township's elevation is listed as 1224 feet above mean sea level. It has a total area of 36.64 square miles.

History
Cedar Township was first settled around 1859.

Demographics
As of the 2010 census, Cedar Township had 230 housing units and a population of 480.

Education 
Cedar Township is in the Newell-Fonda Community School District.

References

Townships in Sac County, Iowa
Townships in Iowa